Vitanza is a surname. Notable people with the surname include:

Aricca Vitanza (born 1989), American soccer player
Catiana Vitanza (born 1990), American soccer player
Joe Vitanza (born 1963), Australian rugby league footballer
Victor Vitanza, American academic